TheDetroiter.com is a website providing articles, blogs, interviews, a calendar of events and editorials for the Detroit, Michigan arts and cultural community. Its motto is "Unearthing a great American city, one story at a time."

Brothers John Sousanis and Nick Sousanis launched TheDetroiter.com in October 2002.
At the time, Oakland Press theater critic John Sousanis focused on coverage of the performing arts, while Nick concentrated on the fine arts.  Conceived as a small series of web pages, John and Nick were responding to what they recognized as a lack of media coverage of a vibrant arts and theater scene in Detroit. In its first four years of operation, TheDetroiter.com has grown from coverage of performing and fine arts to reviews of restaurants, editorials on urban development and documentation of lifestyles in Detroit.
TheDetroiter also offers short histories on some of Detroit's art galleries.
TheDetroiter helped find art galleries and designed the gallery guide for Art Detroit Now, a Detroit area gallery crawl.

It provides current, in-debth cultural critiques about various Detroit art venues, which include the Museum of Contemporary Art Detroit, the Detroit Institute of Arts, the Contemporary Art Institute, Re:View Gallery, and the Detroit Artists Market.  The following Detroit based writers have contributed to the online publication:

Tom Carbone
Gregory Tom
Vince Carducci
Tommy Onyx
Heather McMacken
William Eric Graham
Rima Nickell
Dennis Alan Nawrocki
Christine Hill
Lynn Crawford
Jacque Liu
Miroslav Cukovic
Eric C. Novack
Cedric Tai 
Clara DeGalan 
Colin Darke

References

5. Voss, Elizabeth (June 20, 2008). ["YMCA buys thedetroiter.com."] DetroitMakeItHere.com. http://www.detroitmakeithere.com/article/20080620/DM01/429853907 Retrieved 2010-04-17.

External links

American news websites
Mass media in Detroit